Svend Nielsen may refer to:
Svend Nielsen (composer)
Svend Nielsen (architect)
Svend Nielsen (footballer)
Svend Nielsen (wrestler)

See also 
Sven Nielsen (disambiguation)